Gustav Carl Helsted (30 January 1857 - 1 March 1924) was a Danish organist and composer. 

Helsted was the son of composer Carl Helsted, brother of painter Viggo Helsted, and nephew of composer Edvard Helsted. He was a student of Gottfred Matthison-Hansen. 

Helsted was the first organist of the Jesus Church in Copenhagen. He was paid 600 Danish crowns a year for the position. He was also the music director of the Danish Musical Society.

Notable works 
 Overture in C minor (piano four hands 1875)
 Scherzo in C# minor (for 2 pianos/eight hands 1880)
 String quartet in B minor (1881)
 op. 1 Erotiske Sangtekster (voice and piano, 1883)
 op. 2 Symphony no. 1 in D minor (1883)
 op. 3 String quartet no. 1 in D minor (1884)
 Romance in G major (violin and piano 1884)
 Romance in A major (violin and piano 1885)
 op. 4 En Kærlighedshistorie (piano 1886)
 op. 5 Paa Fodtur en Sommerdag (suite for orchestra 1885)
 op. 6 piano trio in E minor (1886)
 op. 7 Six songs (1886)
 op. 8 Violin concerto in C major (1887)
 op. 9 En Bryllupsfest (orchestral suite 1887)
 op. 10 Suite no. 2 in A major (orchestra 1887)
 op. 11 Romance for violin and orchestra in G major (1888)
 op. 12 Fem sange (1889)
 op. 13 Sonata in A major (violin and piano 1889)
 op. 14 Fem Fantasistykker (piano 1889)
 op. 15 Gurresange (soloists, chorus and orchestra 1889)
 op. 16 Fantasy sonata in E minor (organ, 1890)
 Sørgemarch in C minor - In memoriam Niels W. Gade (orchestra 1891)
 op. 17 Trio in C major (violin, viola and cello 1891)
 op. 18 Decet in D major (wind quintet, string quartet and contrabass, 1891)
 op. 19 String quartet no. 2 in C minor (1891)
 op. 20 Sonata no. 2 in G major (violin and piano 1892)
 op. 21 String quintet in E major (1895)
 op. 22 Symphony no. 2 in E major (1886)
 op. 23 Sange af J.P. Jacobsen (1896)
 op. 24 String quartet no. 3 in F major (1898)
 op. 25 Abels Død (Abel's Death) (voices, choir and orchestra 1895/1912)
 op. 26 String sextet in E major (1892/1907)
 Præludium in A major (organ 1900)
 op. 27 Violin concerto no. 2 in B minor (1900/1909)
 op. 28 Dansemusik (female choir and firhændig piano 1905)
 op. 29 Organ sonata in D major (1906)
 op. 30 Vort land (voices, choir and orchestra 1907)
 op. 31 Stormklokken (opera 1900/1911)
 Romance in G major (cello and piano 1907)
 24 songs (1899–1907)
 Romance in F major (violin and piano 1909)
 Præludium in G major (organ 1915)
 Suite for String Orchestra (1919)
 Gud Helligaand! opfyld - (choir 1920)
 Sne (Snow) (choir and orchestra 1921)
 op. 32 Sommer in Gurre (Holger Drachmann)
 op. 33 String quartet in F minor (1922)
 op. 35 Cello concerto in C major
 Marche funèbre (organ, for the funeral of P. S. Kröyers)

See also
List of Danish composers

References

This article was initially translated from the Danish Wikipedia.

Cited works

External links

Danish composers
Male composers
1857 births
1924 deaths